James Grand (8 March 1857 – 7 November 1921) was a Canadian businessman who founded the stationery store Grand & Toy with his brother-in-law, Samuel Martin Toy, in 1883. Toy died in 1906 and firm was in control by the Grand family until 1990.

Grand was married to Elizabeth Jane Toy in Toronto on 8 March 1881. They had three sons, including Percy Grand, who succeeded Grand as head of the firm until 1913.

References

External links 

 

1857 births
1921 deaths
Businesspeople from Toronto
Canadian retail chief executives
Burials at St. James Cemetery, Toronto